Anthony Morris House is a historic home located near Norristown in Worcester Township, Montgomery County, Pennsylvania.  The log house was built in 1717, and is a two-story, two bay by two bay, stone dwelling.  It measures approximately 25 feet square.

It was added to the National Register of Historic Places in 1980.

References

Houses on the National Register of Historic Places in Pennsylvania
Houses completed in 1717
Houses in Montgomery County, Pennsylvania
National Register of Historic Places in Montgomery County, Pennsylvania
1717 establishments in Pennsylvania